Electric cars (or electric vehicles, EVs) have a smaller environmental footprint than conventional internal combustion engine vehicles (ICEVs). While aspects of their production can induce similar, less or alternative environmental impacts, they produce little or no tailpipe emissions, and reduce dependence on petroleum, greenhouse gas emissions, and health effects from air pollution. Electric motors are significantly more efficient than internal combustion engines and thus, even accounting for typical power plant efficiencies and distribution losses, less energy is required to operate an EV. Manufacturing batteries for electric cars requires additional resources and energy, so they may have a larger environmental footprint from the production phase. EVs also generate different impacts in their operation and maintenance. EVs are typically heavier and could produce more tire and road dust air pollution, but their regenerative braking could reduce such particulate pollution from brakes. EVs are mechanically simpler, which reduces the use and disposal of engine oil.

Comparison with Fossil-Fueled Cars 
Although all cars have effects on other people, battery electric cars have major environmental benefits over conventional internal combustion engine vehicles (ICEVs), such as:
 Elimination of harmful tailpipe pollutants such as various oxides of nitrogen, which kill thousands of people every year
 EVs use 38 megajoules per 100 km in comparison to 142 megajoules per 100 km for ICE cars.
 Less  emissions globally than fossil-fuelled cars, thus limiting climate change
Plug-in hybrids capture most of these benefits when they are operating in all-electric mode.

Electric cars have some disadvantages, such as:

 Possible increased particulate matter emissions from tires compared to fossil-fueled cars. This is sometimes caused by the fact that most electric cars have a heavy battery, which means the car's tires are subjected to more wear. This is drastically reduced when EV-rated weight-specific tires are used on the EV which are built specifically for the extra weight. Devices to capture tyre particulates are being developed.
The brake pads, however, can be used less frequently than in non-electric cars, if regenerative braking is available and may thus sometimes produce less particulate pollution than brakes in non-electric cars. Also, some electric cars may have a combination of drum brakes and disc brakes, and drum brakes are known to cause less particulate emissions than disc brakes.
Reliance on rare-earth elements such as neodymium, lanthanum, terbium, and dysprosium, and other critical metals such as lithium and cobalt, though the quantity of rare metals used differs per car. Despite the name rare earth metals are plentiful. They make up a tiny share of the minerals used to make a car.

Materials Extraction Impact

Raw Materials 
Plug-in hybrids and electric cars run off lithium-ion batteries and rare-earth element electric motors. Electric vehicles use much more lithium carbonate equivalent (LCE) in their batteries compared to the 7g (0.25 oz) for a smartphone or the 30g (1.1 oz) used by tablets or computers. As of 2016, a hybrid electric passenger car might use 5 kg (11 lb) of LCE, while one of Tesla's high performance electric cars could use as much as 80 kg (180 lb) of LCE. 

Most EVs use permanent magnet motors as they are more efficient than induction motors. These permanent magnets use neodymium and praseodymium which can be dirty and difficult to produce.

The demand for lithium used by the batteries and rare-earth elements (such as neodymium, boron, and cobalt) used by the electric motors, is expected to grow significantly due to the future sales increase of plug-in electric vehicles.

In 2022 the IPCC said (with medium confidence) "Emerging national strategies on critical minerals and the requirements from major vehicle manufacturers are leading to new, more geographically diverse mines. The standardisation of battery modules and packaging within and across vehicle platforms, as well as increased focus on design for recyclability are important. Given the high degree of potential recyclability of lithium-ion batteries, a nearly closed-loop system in the future could mitigate concerns about critical mineral issues."

Lithium 

The main deposits of lithium are found in China and throughout the Andes mountain chain in South America. In 2008 Chile was the leading lithium metal producer with almost 30%, followed by China, Argentina, and Australia. Lithium recovered from brine, such as in Nevada and Cornwall, is much more environmentally friendly.

Nearly half the world's known reserves are located in Bolivia, and according to the US Geological Survey, Bolivia's Salar de Uyuni desert has 5.4 million tons of lithium. Other important reserves are located in Chile, China, and Brazil.

According to a 2020 study balancing lithium supply and demand for the rest of the century needs good recycling systems, vehicle-to-grid integration, and lower lithium intensity of transportation.

Rare-Earth Elements 

China has 48% of the world's reserves of rare-earth elements, the United States has 13%, and Russia, Australia, and Canada have significant deposits. Until the 1980s, the U.S. led the world in rare-earth production, but since the mid-1990s China has controlled the world market for these elements. The mines in Bayan Obo near Baotou, Inner Mongolia, are currently the largest source of rare-earth metals and are 80% of China's production.

Manufacturing Impact 
Electric cars also have impacts arising from the manufacturing of the vehicle. The manufacturing of the battery results in significant environmental impact, as it requires copper and aluminum for its anode and cathode. Since battery packs are heavy, manufacturers work to lighten the rest of the vehicle. As a result, electric car components contain many lightweight materials that require a lot of energy to produce and process, such as aluminium and carbon-fiber-reinforced polymers.

The manufacturing of EV motors also results in environmental impacts.  Electric cars can utilize two types of motors: permanent magnet motors (like the one found in the Mercedes EQA), and induction motors (like the one found on the Tesla Model 3). Induction motors do not use magnets, but permanent magnet motors do. The magnets found in permanent magnet motors used in electric vehicles contain rare-earth metals to increase the power output of these motors. The mining and processing of metals such as lithium, copper, and nickel requires significant  energy and can release toxic compounds into the surrounding area. Local populations may be exposed to toxic substances through air and groundwater contamination.

Several reports have found that hybrid electric vehicles, plug-in hybrids and all-electric cars generate more carbon emissions during their production than current ICE vehicles but still have a lower overall carbon footprint over the full life cycle. The initial higher carbon footprint is due mainly to battery production,  but it is difficult to measure the embodied energy that is used to create the energy used to power the vehicle.

Consumer use impacts

Air pollution and carbon emissions 

Compared to conventional internal combustion engine automobiles, electric cars reduce local air pollution, especially in cities, as they do not emit harmful tailpipe pollutants such as particulates (soot), volatile organic compounds, hydrocarbons, carbon monoxide, ozone, lead, and various oxides of nitrogen. Some of the environmental impact may instead be shifted to the site of the generation plants, depending on the method by which the electricity used to recharge the batteries is generated. This shift of environmental impact from the vehicle itself (in the case of ICE vehicles) to the source of electricity (in the case of EVs) is referred to as the long tailpipe of electric vehicles. This impact, however, is still less than that of traditional vehicles, as the large size of power plants allow them to generate less emissions per unit power than internal combustion engines, and electricity generation continues to become greener as renewables such as wind, solar and nuclear power become more widespread.

The specific emission intensity of generating electric power varies significantly with respect to location and time, depending on current demand and availability of renewable sources (See List of renewable energy topics by country and territory). The phase-out of fossil fuels and coal and transition to renewable and low-carbon power sources will make electricity generation greener, which will reduce the impact of EVs that use that electricity.

Charging a vehicle using only renewable energy (e.g., wind power or solar panels) yields a very low carbon footprint. The emissions are generated exclusively by the production and installation of the generation system (see Energy Returned On Energy Invested.) A household with solar panels can feasibly produce enough energy to offset the power needed to charge an electric car, and thus (on average) make the EV produce net-zero emissions.

Particulates 
The operation of electric vehicles results in brake dust, airborne road dust, and tire erosion, which contribute to particulate matter in the air. Particulate matter is dangerous for respiratory health. In the UK non-tailpipe PM from all types of vehicles (including EVs) may be responsible for between 7,000 and 8,000 premature deaths a year.

Lower operational impacts and maintenance needs 
Battery electric vehicles have lower maintenance costs compared to internal combustion vehicles since electronic systems break down much less often than the mechanical systems in conventional vehicles, and the fewer mechanical systems onboard last longer due to the better use of the electric engine. Electric cars do not require oil changes and other routine maintenance checks.

Internal combustion engines are relatively inefficient at converting on-board fuel energy to propulsion as most of the energy is wasted as heat, and the rest while the engine is idling. Electric motors, on the other hand, are more efficient at converting stored energy into driving a vehicle. Electric drive vehicles do not consume energy while at rest or coasting, and modern plug-in cars can capture and reuse as much as one fifth of the energy normally lost during braking through regenerative braking. Typically, conventional gasoline engines effectively use only 15% of the fuel energy content to move the vehicle or to power accessories, and diesel engines can reach on-board efficiencies of 20%, while electric drive vehicles typically have on-board efficiencies of around 80%.

End-of-life

Batteries

Lead-acid 
Like ICE cars, many electric cars, as of 2021, contain lead–acid batteries which are used to power the vehicle's auxiliary electrical systems. In some countries lead acid batteries are not recycled safely.

Lithium-ion 
Current retirement criteria for lithium-ion batteries in electric vehicles cite 80% capacity for end-of-first-life, and 65% capacity for end-of-second-life. The first-life defines the lifespan of the battery's intended use, while the second-life defines the lifespan of the battery's subsequent use-case. Lithium-ion batteries from cars can sometimes be re-used for a second-life in factories or as stationary batteries. Some electric vehicle manufacturers, such as Tesla, claim that a lithium-ion battery that no longer fulfills the requirements of its intended use can be serviced by them directly, thereby lengthening its first-life. Reused electric vehicle batteries can potentially supply 60-100% of the grid-scale lithium-ion energy storage by 2030. The carbon footprint of an electric vehicle lithium-ion battery can be reduced by up to 17% if reused rather than immediately retired. After retirement, direct recycling processes allow reuse of cathode mixtures, which removes processing steps required for manufacturing them. When this is infeasible, individual materials can be obtained through pyrometallurgy and hydrometallurgy. When lithium-ion batteries are recycled, if they are not handled properly, the harmful substances inside will cause secondary pollution to the environment. These same processes can also endanger workers and damage their health. Lithium-ion batteries, when disposed of in household trash, can present fire hazards in transport and in landfills, resulting in trash fires that can destroy other recyclable materials and create increased carbon dioxide and particulate matter emissions.

Motors 
Electric motors are an essential component of electric cars that convert electrical energy into mechanical energy to move the wheels, where neodymium magnets are commonly used in the manufacturing process. There is currently no cost-effective way for the industry to recycle electric motors due to the complicated extraction process of these magnets. Many electric motors end up in the landfill or are shredded because there is no viable recycle or disposal alternative.

Two primary efforts to remedy this dilemma include the DEMETER project and a joint venture between Nissan Motors and Waseda University to lessen the environment impact of electric motors. The DEMETER project was a research initiative between the European Union and private entities, which culminated in the development of a recyclable electric motor designed by French company Valeo. Nissan and Waseda identified and refined a new process for extracting rare-earth magnets for re-use in the manufacturing of new electric vehicle motors.

See also 
 All-electric mode
 Battery
 Battery fade
 Converting existing vehicle to electric 
 Downcycling of end-of-life e-automotive batteries
 Electric power
 Electric velomobiles
 Fuel cell car
 Full cost accounting
 Hybrid electric vehicle
 Induction motor
 Modal shift
 NEVs 
 Phase-out of fossil fuel vehicles
 Plug-in hybrid electric car
 Robotic disassembly of electric car batteries
 Solar car
 Vehicles powered by advanced biofuels

References

Electric vehicle industry
Environmental issues
Environmental impact of products